Timeless: The Classics Vol. 2 is an album of covers by Michael Bolton, released in 1999.

The album is a follow-up to Bolton's 1992 covers album Timeless: The Classics. Unlike that album, however, which reached #1 and ultimately sold over 9 million copies, Vol. 2 failed to chart altogether on the Top 200, becoming Bolton's first album to not chart since 1985's Everybody's Crazy.

Track listing

"Warm and Tender Love" was not included on American releases of the album, which makes "Whiter Shade of Pale" the eleventh and final track on that edition.

Personnel 

 Michael Bolton – lead vocals
 Rob Mathes – keyboards and programming (1, 4-6, 8, 10, 12)
 Dave Delhomme – keyboards (1, 2, 3, 5-8)
 Greg Phillinganes – keyboards (1, 2, 3, 5-8), rhythm arrangements (1, 2, 3, 5-8)
 Andre Betts – programming (1)
 Jan Folkson – programming (1, 4-6, 8, 10, 12)
 Tony Harrell – Hammond B3 organ (4, 9, 10, 12), keyboards (4, 9, 10, 12), synthesizers (4, 9, 10, 12)
 John Hobbs – acoustic piano (4, 9, 10, 12), synthesizers (4, 9, 10, 12)
 Dann Huff – electric guitar (1, 7, 9), guitar (4, 12)
 Jeff Mironov – guitar (1-3, 5-8)
 Michael Thompson – electric guitar (2, 3)
 Blue Miller – acoustic guitar (4, 9, 10, 12)
 Kenny Greenberg – electric guitar (4, 9, 10, 12)
 Steve Lukather – guitar (5, 6, 8, 10)
 Neil Jason – bass (1-3, 5-8), programming (1, 10, 12)
 Michael Rhodes – bass (4, 9, 10, 12)
 Shawn Pelton – drums (1-3, 5-8)
 Eddie Bayers – drums (4, 9, 10, 12)
 Bashiri Johnson – percussion (1-5, 9, 10, 12)
 Dave Koz – alto saxophone (3, 5)
 Michael Brecker – tenor saxophone (6)
 Bob Bailey – backing vocals (1, 3, 5)
 Lisa Cochran – backing vocals (1, 3, 5)
 Melonie Daniels – backing vocals (1, 5-7)
 Kim Fleming – backing vocals (1, 3, 5)
 Vicki Hampton – backing vocals (1, 3, 5)
 Trey Lorenz – backing vocals (1, 5-7)
 Mary Ann Tatum - backing vocals (1, 5-7)
 Lisa Amann – backing vocals (2, 6)
 Michael Mellett – backing vocals (2, 4, 6)
 Wendy Moten – backing vocals (2, 4, 6)
 Nicol Smith – backing vocals (2, 4, 6)
 Chris Rodriguez – backing vocals (4)

Production 
 Producers – Michael Bolton and Phil Ramone; Barry Beckett (tracks 4, 9, 10 & 12).
 Engineers – Pete Greene, Steve Milo, Dave Reitzas and Eric Schilling.
 Assistant Engineers – Dave Boyer, Andrew Felluss, Tim Harkins and Jason Stasium.
 Recorded at A&M Studios (Hollywood, CA); Emerald Entertainment (Nashville, TN); Passion Studios (Westport, CT); Right Track Recording (New York, NY).
 Mixing – Mick Guzauski (tracks 1-8, 10, 11 & 12); Dave Reitzas (track 9).
 Mix Assistants – Tom Bender and Nick Marshall
 Mastered by Ted Jensen at Sterling Sound (New York, NY).
 Production Manager and Musical Contractor – Jill Dell'Abate
 Production Coordinator – Gina Cheshire (tracks 4, 9, 10 & 12)
 Art Direction and Design – Christopher Austopchuck and Joel Zimmerman
 Photography – Timothy White

References

See also
 1999 in music

Michael Bolton albums
1999 albums
Covers albums